Terthreutis argentea is a species of moth of the  family Tortricidae. It is found in India (West Bengal, Sikkim).

The wingspan is 16–21 mm. The ground colour of the forewings is white in the dorsal, mediobasal and apical parts of the wing, but tinged with brownish in the costal and basal area and postmedially. It is mixed with ochreous subterminally. The hindwings are brownish grey, but whitish in the distal half. Adults have been recorded on wing in October.

References

Archipini
Moths described in 1886
Moths of Asia